Marcello Mimmi (18 July 1882 – 6 March 1961) was an Italian Cardinal of the Roman Catholic Church. He served as Archbishop of Naples from 1952 to 1957, and Secretary of the Sacred Consistorial Congregation from 1957 until his death. Mimmi was elevated to the cardinalate in 1953 by Pope Pius XII.

Life and church
Marcello Mimi was born in San Pietro in Casale and studied at the seminary in Bologna before being ordained to the priesthood on 23 December 1905. He then did pastoral work and taught at the Bologna seminary until 1930. He was elevated to a Privy Chamberlain of His Holiness on 19 November 1919, and later named rector of the Regional Seminary of Romagna.

On 30 June 1930, Mimmi was appointed Bishop of Crema by Pope Pius XI. He received his episcopal consecration on the following 25 July from Cardinal Giovanni Nasalli Rocca di Corneliano, with Bishops Ettore Lodi and Giovanni Franzini serving as co-consecrators. Mimmi was later named Archbishop of Bari on 31 July 1933, and Archbishop of Naples on 30 August 1952.

Pope Pius XII created him Cardinal-Priest of S. Callisto in the consistory of 12 January 1953. Mimmi served as papal legate to several ecclesiastical gatherings from 1955 to 1960. 

On 15 December 1957, the Cardinal was made Secretary of the Sacred Consistorial Congregation in the Roman Curia. Mimmi later chose to be advanced to the rank of Cardinal Bishop, receiving the suburbicarian see of Sabina e Poggio Mirteto on 9 June 1958. He was also one of the cardinal electors who participated in the 1958 papal conclave that selected Pope John XXIII.

Mimmi died in Rome, at age 78. He is buried in the Cathedral of Magliano Sabina.

Mimmi also served as President of the Pontifical Commission for Latin America and of the Cardinalatial Commission for the Shrine of Pompeii from 1958 until his death.

References

External links
Cardinals of the Holy Roman Church
Catholic-Hierarchy

1882 births
1961 deaths
People from the Province of Bologna
Cardinals created by Pope Pius XII
20th-century Italian Roman Catholic archbishops
Archbishops of Naples
20th-century Italian cardinals
Cardinal-bishops of Sabina
Members of the Sacred Consistorial Congregation
Pontifical Commission for Latin America